Eristalis stipator, the yellow-shouldered drone fly, is a species of hoverfly native to North America. It is abundant in western North America, with a few scattered records in the east. It flies from mid-May (or as early as February in the south of its range) to early November, and is known to hilltop.

References

Further reading

External links

 

Eristalinae
Articles created by Qbugbot
Insects described in 1877
Taxa named by Carl Robert Osten-Sacken